Shankar Singh Rawat is an Indian politician from the Bharatiya Janata Party and a member of the Rajasthan Legislative Assembly representing the Beawar constituency.

References

Rajasthan MLAs 2003–2008
1955 births
Bharatiya Janata Party politicians from Rajasthan
Living people
Rajasthan MLAs 2008–2013
Rajasthan MLAs 2018–2023